The legislature of the U.S. state of Louisiana has convened many times since statehood became effective on April 30, 1812.

Legislatures

 1st Legislature, 1812-1814 
 2nd Legislature, 1814-1816 
 3rd Legislature, 1816-1818 
 4th Legislature, 1819-1820 
 5th Legislature, 1821-1822 
 6th Legislature, 1823-1824 
 7th Legislature, 1824-1825 
 8th Legislature, 1827-1828 
 9th Legislature, 1828-1830 
 11th Legislature, 1833 
 12th Legislature, 1835-1836 
 13th Legislature, 1837 
 14th Legislature, 1839-1840 
 15th Legislature, 1841 
 16th Legislature, 1843-1844 
 17th Legislature, 1845 
 2017: February 13–22, April 10-June 8, June 8–16, 2017 
 2018: March 12-May 18, 2018  
 2019: April 8-June 6, 2019 
 71st Louisiana Legislature, until 2023

See also
 List of speakers of the Louisiana House of Representatives
 List of presidents of the Louisiana State Senate
 List of governors of Louisiana
 History of Louisiana

References

External links
 Louisiana State Legislature. Sessions, 1997-current
 
 
 

Legislatures
Legislature
 
Louisiana
Louisiana
Louisiana